Confederation of Trade Unions may mean:

Confederation of Trade Unions (Albania)
Hong Kong Confederation of Trade Unions
Norwegian Confederation of Trade Unions